Voluntarios en Defensa de los Animales (VEDA), which means  Volunteers in Defense of Animals, is a nonprofit organization that works for the welfare of domestic and wild animals in Bolivia. It was founded on April 6, 1996.  Its main objective is to establish and protect the rights of animals through formal and informal education.

Campaigns 
In 1997, VEDA collaborated with the Asociación Ecológica del  Oriente (Eastern Ecological Association) in a protest against the use of Folidol, a pesticide widely used that is believed to produce health problems and even death in humans and other species of  animals.

In June 2005, VEDA, collaborated with the campaign of two other Animal Rights Organizations; Soprama- Santa Cruz and Animales SOS -La Paz,  to rescue animals affected by the flood in San Julián, Santa Cruz.

On August 16, 2006, VEDA, organized the first "Walk for Animals Rights in Bolivia" .

Other activities include, protests against the abuse by the Municipal animal shelters, the killings of dogs in the towns of Warnes and Achacachi, where the group Ponchos Rojos (Red Ponchos) decapitated two dogs, the International Day for Animal’s Rights, and against vivisection at the State Veterinary University.

Some other activities included, a Children's drawing and painting contest, an interschool Research Contest, and a Charity Bingo, and the sale of second hand items as a way to collect funds to build a shelter for the animals.

Objectives 
Among its objectives, VEDA, offers education campaigns on responsible pet ownership, promotes the sterilization of dogs and cats, reports and ensures compliance of the Municipal Ordinance 030/2006, disseminates information on adoptions, promotes vegetarianism  and is against the use of animals for scientific, entertainment, exhibition and trade purposes.

References

External links
  Voluntarios en Defensa de los Animales

Animal welfare organisations based in Bolivia
Animal shelters
Organizations established in 1996